Valerii Redkozubov (also spelled Valery, born 20 July 1972) is a Russian male visually impaired Paralympic alpine skier. He has represented Russia at the Paralympics on 3 Winter Paralympic events in 2010, 2014 and 2018. He was the flagbearer for Russia during the 2014 Winter Paralympics as he led the Russian Paralympic delegation in its home nation at the opening ceremony of the event. He was awarded the Order "For Merit to the Fatherland" by the Russian President, Vladimir Putin in 2014 for his outstanding performance at the 2014 Winter Paralympics. Valerii Redkozubov was also awarded the Medal of the Order "For Merit to the Fatherland" in March 2018 by Vladimir Putin after his impressive Paralympic record during the  2018 Winter Paralympics.

Career 
Valery Redkozubov has claimed 5 medals in his Paralympic career including 2 gold medals since making his debut at the Vancouver Winter Paralympics.

2010 Winter Paralympics 
Valery made his Paralympic debut for Russia at the 2010 Winter Paralympics and competed in the alpine skiing events. He went medalless during the competition before making a standout performance at the Sochi Winter Paralympics in 2014.

2014 Winter Paralympics 
Valery Redkozubov competed for Russia at the 2014 Winter Paralympics which was his second consecutive Winter Paralympic appearance and competed in the alpine skiing events. He was the flagbearer for the Russian team at the opening ceremony. He claimed his first Paralympic medal during the 2014 Winter Paralympics as he clinched a gold medal in the men's slalom visually impaired event and repeated his gold medal hunt by claiming a gold medal in the men's combined visually impaired event. Valerii Redkozubov also secured a bronze medal in the men's giant slalom visually impaired event, which was his third medal at the 2014 Winter Paralympics and was also his third Paralympic medal in his Paralympic career.

2018 Winter Paralympics 
Valery Redkozubov competed for Neutral Paralympic Athletes at the 2018 Winter Paralympics after the official ban for Russia from competing from both 2018 Winter Olympics and 2018 Winter Paralympics due to doping scandal. He claimed 2 bronze medals at the alpine skiing events.

References

External links 

 

1972 births
Living people
Russian male alpine skiers
Alpine skiers at the 2010 Winter Paralympics
Alpine skiers at the 2014 Winter Paralympics
Alpine skiers at the 2018 Winter Paralympics
Paralympic alpine skiers of Russia
Paralympic gold medalists for Russia
Paralympic bronze medalists for Russia
Medalists at the 2014 Winter Paralympics
Medalists at the 2018 Winter Paralympics
Russian blind people
Visually impaired category Paralympic competitors
Recipients of the Order "For Merit to the Fatherland", 4th class
Recipients of the Medal of the Order "For Merit to the Fatherland" I class
People from Gukovo
Sportspeople from Rostov Oblast
Paralympic medalists in alpine skiing